Richard Gene Williams (May 4, 1931 – November 4, 1985) was an American jazz trumpeter.

Biography
Williams was born in Galveston, Texas, and played tenor saxophone early in his life before picking up trumpet as a teenager. He played in local Texas bands and attended Wiley College, where he majored in music. After serving in the Air Force from 1952–56, he toured Europe with Lionel Hampton, and upon his return took a master's degree at the Manhattan School of Music.

Williams played with Charles Mingus at the Newport Jazz Festival in 1959, and recorded with Mingus starting in that year. He recorded his only session as a leader, New Horn in Town (1960) for Candid Records, and featuring Reggie Workman, Leo Wright, Richard Wyands, and Bobby Thomas. Williams was a sideman on many  releases for Blue Note, Impulse!, New Jazz, Riverside, and Atlantic in the 1960s. Among the musicians he worked with, apart from Mingus, are Oliver Nelson, Grant Green, Lou Donaldson, Yusef Lateef, Gigi Gryce, and Duke Jordan and the big bands of Duke Ellington, Gil Evans, Thad Jones and Mel Lewis, Sam Rivers and Clark Terry.

He also found work on Broadway in pit orchestras, in particular the premiere productions of The Me Nobody Knows and The Wiz. He appears on the original Broadway cast recordings of both musicals. Williams also led bands under his own leadership, playing in New York jazz clubs such as Sweet Basil, the Village Vanguard, and Gerald's. In addition to jazz trumpet, Williams also performed with classical orchestras, playing piccolo trumpet and fluglehorn.

Williams died on November 4, 1985 from kidney cancer in his Jamaica, New York home, at the age of 54.

Discography

As leader
 New Horn in Town (Candid, 1960)

As sideman
With Ahmed Abdul-Malik
 Sounds of Africa (New Jazz, 1961)
With Mose Allison
 Hello There, Universe (Atlantic, 1970)
With Jaki Byard
 Out Front! (Prestige, 1964)
With Eddie "Lockjaw" Davis
 Trane Whistle (Prestige, 1960)
With Booker Ervin
 Cookin' (Savoy, 1960)
 The In Between (Blue Note, 1968)
With Bill Evans and George Russell
 Living Time (Columbia, 1972)
With Red Garland
 Soul Burnin' (Prestige 1960)
 Rediscovered Masters (Prestige 1970)
With Gigi Gryce
 Saying Somethin'! (New Jazz, 1960)
 The Hap'nin's (New Jazz, 1960)
 The Rat Race Blues (New Jazz, 1960)
 Reminiscin' (Mercury, 1960)
 Doin' the Gigi (Uptown, 2011)
With Slide Hampton
 Sister Salvation (Atlantic, 1960)
 Somethin' Sanctified (Atlantic, 1960)
 Drum Suite (Epic, 1962)
 Exodus (Philips, 1962 [1964])
With John Handy
 In the Vernacular (Roulette, 1958)
With Noah Howard
 Red Star (Boxholder, 2001)
With Sam Jones
Something New (Interplay, 1979)
With Duke Jordan
 Duke's Delight (SteepleChase, 1975)
With Rahsaan Roland Kirk
 The Roland Kirk Quartet Meets the Benny Golson Orchestra (Mercury, 1964)
 Left & Right (Atlantic, 1968)
 Other Folks' Music (Atlantic 1976)
With Yusef Lateef
 The Centaur and the Phoenix (Riverside, 1960)
 Jazz 'Round the World (Impulse!, 1963)
 Live at Pep's (Impulse! 1964)
With Les McCann
 Comment (Atlantic, 1970)
With Jack McDuff
 The Fourth Dimension (Cadet, 1974)
With Charles McPherson
 Today's Man (Mainstream, 1973)
With Carmen McRae
 Something to Swing About (Kapp, 1959)
With Charles Mingus
 Mingus Dynasty (Columbia 1959)
 Pre-Bird (Mingus Revisited) (Mercury 1961)
 The Complete Town Hall Concert (Blue Note, 1962 [1994])
 The Black Saint and the Sinner Lady (Impulse!, 1963)
 Mingus Mingus Mingus Mingus Mingus (Impulse!, 1963)
With Mingus Dynasty
 Reincarnation (Soul Note, SN1042, 1982)
With Oliver Nelson
 Screamin' the Blues (New Jazz, NJ 8243, 1960)
With John Patton
 The Way I Feel (Blue Note 1964)
With Hilton Ruiz
Excition (SteepleChase, 1977)
Steppin' Into Beauty (SteepleChase, 1977 [1982])
With Jimmy Smith
 Hoochie Coochie Man (Verve, 1966)
With The Thad Jones/Mel Lewis Orchestra
 Presenting Thad Jones/Mel Lewis and the Jazz Orchestra (Solid State, 1966)
 Presenting Joe Williams and Thad Jones/Mel Lewis, The Jazz Orchestra (Solid State, 1966)
 Live at the Village Vanguard (Solid State, 1967)
 The Big Band Sound of Thad Jones / Mel Lewis Featuring Miss Ruth Brown (Solid State, 1968)
 Monday Night (Solid State, 1968)
 Central Park North (Solid State, 1969)
With Charles Tolliver
 Music Inc. (Strata-East, 1971)
 Impact (Strata-East, 1975)
With Randy Weston
 Uhuru Afrika (Roulette, 1960)
With Leo Wright
 *Blues Shout (Atlantic, 1960)
With Max Roach
 It's Time (Impulse!, 1962)

References

External links

1931 births
1985 deaths
People from Galveston, Texas
American jazz trumpeters
American male trumpeters
Candid Records artists
Wiley College alumni
20th-century American musicians
20th-century trumpeters
Jazz musicians from Texas
20th-century American male musicians
American male jazz musicians
Mingus Dynasty (band) members
The Thad Jones/Mel Lewis Orchestra members
Deaths from kidney cancer